Bicester Village (2015–present, previously Bicester Town 1987–2014, Bicester London Road 1954–1968, Bicester 1850–1954) is one of two railway stations serving the town of Bicester in Oxfordshire (the other is ). The renamed Bicester Village station reopened on 25 October 2015 with trains initially running between Oxford Parkway and London Marylebone. All trains serving it are operated by Chiltern Railways.

History

Originally named "Bicester", the station was renamed "Bicester London Road" in March 1954, although the nameboards were not altered until 20 September 1954.

1968 closure

The station was closed, along with the rest of the Oxford–Bletchley section of the Varsity Line, on 1 January 1968. However, the station was used by several excursion trains through the 1970s and 1980s.

1987 reopening

Network SouthEast reopened the station as "Bicester Town" on 11 May 1987, as the terminus of the Oxford to Bicester Line. From May 2009, First Great Western and Oxfordshire County Council branded the line "The Bicester Link". Since then, operation of the line has been transferred from FGW to Chiltern Railways.

Since 1987, the frequency of trains has varied and passenger numbers have fluctuated accordingly. In the four years 2007–2011, more frequent trains led to an increase in the total number of passengers using Bicester Town by 258%.

In August 2008, Chiltern Railways announced a proposal to build a new  chord to link the Oxford-to-Bicester Line with the Chiltern Main Line to carry a new service between Oxford and London via . Approval was granted in October 2012.

From December 2008, the service on Mondays to Saturdays was improved, with an evening service and a doubling of the service on Saturdays. The service was increased to 11 trains Monday-to-Thursday, 12 on Fridays, and 13 on Saturdays. From May 2009, further improvements saw extra trains in the daytime on Mondays to Fridays and a new all-year-round Sunday service, with trains every 90 minutes.

It was later amended to 2015.

2014 closure for rebuild, 2015 reopening 
The last trains ran late on 14 February 2014 before the station was closed to allow upgrade of the line between Oxford and Bicester. The reopening, first planned for May 2015, was delayed until 25 October 2015 with the official ceremony the following day.

On 12 March 2015, Chiltern Railways announced that it would rename the station Bicester Village after the nearby designer retail outlet. This change has been seen as controversial by many who live in Bicester who thought that it had taken place without proper consultation.

Before it closed for the rebuild, the station had one platform, a covered waiting area, seats, a clock, help point and public address. There were a number of cycle stands but no ticket facilities. Passengers could buy these on the train instead. As part of the works, the station was completely rebuilt as a two-platform station, and ticket machines provided.

Station facilities
The station has two car parks; between them they provide 230 standard spaces, plus 18 spaces for passengers with reduced mobility. The station also has parking for 60 pedal cycles and 18 motorcycles. There is a shuttle bus which connects the station to the shopping village while other services also serve the station.

Services

Future services

, the line eastward towards Bletchley is out of service while work is in progress on the section between Bicester and Bletchley. The route is scheduled to reopen by late 2024. Services are planned that will link Bicester to Winslow, Milton Keynes and Bedford.

Once East West Rail is running, an hourly  service and half-hourly Oxford service are planned, bringing the total number of trains between Bicester Village and Oxford to five per hour, several times the service frequency it had before rebuilding.

References

Notes

External links

 East West Rail Consortium
 Chiltern Railways Evergreen 3 project

Railway stations in Oxfordshire
DfT Category F1 stations
Former London and North Western Railway stations
Railway stations in Great Britain opened in 1850
Railway stations in Great Britain closed in 1968
Railway stations in Great Britain opened in 1987
Railway stations in Great Britain closed in 2014
Railway stations served by Chiltern Railways
Bicester
Railway stations in Great Britain opened in 2015
Reopened railway stations in Great Britain
East West Rail